Jelogir or Jolowgir or Jolow Gir or Jelow Gir or Jalogir or Jelugir or Jelo Gir may refer to:

Jolowgir, Ardabil
Jelogir, Khuzestan
Jelogir, Lorestan
Jelogir Rural District